The Second Federal Electoral District of Coahuila (II Distrito Electoral Federal de Coahuila) is one of the 300 Electoral Districts into which Mexico is divided for the purpose of elections to the federal Chamber of Deputies and one of seven such districts in the state of Coahuila.

It elects one deputy to the lower house of Congress for each three-year legislative period, by means of the first past the post system.

District territory
Coahuila's Second District is one of the country's largest in terms of its surface area. Under the 2005 districting scheme,
it covers the municipalities of
Cuatrociénegas, Francisco I. Madero, Frontera, Lamadrid, Múzquiz, Nadadores, Ocampo, San Juan de Sabinas, San Pedro, San Buenaventura and Sierra Mojada.

The district's head town (cabecera distrital), where results from individual polling stations are gathered together and collated, is the city of San Pedro de las Colonias.

Previous districting schemes

1996–2005 district
Between 1996 and 2005, the Second District's territory was in the north and north-west of the state, comprising roughly the municipalities as at present:
Cuatrociénegas (municipality), Francisco I. Madero, Frontera, Lamadrid, Nadadores, Ocampo, Sacramento, San Pedro and Sierra Mojada.

Deputies returned to Congress from this district

L Legislature
1976–1979: Carlos Ortiz Tejada (PRI)
LI Legislature
1979–1982:
LII Legislature
1982–1985:
LIII Legislature
1985–1988:
LIV Legislature
1988–1991:
LV Legislature
1991–1994:
LVI Legislature
1994–1997: Manlio Fabio Gómez Uranga (PRI)
LVII Legislature
1997–2000: Javier Guerrero García (PRI)
LVIII Legislature
2000–2003: Jesús de la Rosa Godoy (PRI)
LIX Legislature
2003–2006: Jesús Zúñiga Romero (Ind.)
LX Legislature
2006–2009: Javier Guerrero García (PRI)

References

Federal electoral districts of Mexico
Federal Electoral District 02
Federal Electoral District 02
Federal Electoral District